Sturgis is a city in Meade County, South Dakota, United States. The population was 7,020 as of the 2020 census. It is the county seat of Meade County and is named after Samuel D. Sturgis, a Union general during the Civil War.

Sturgis is notable as the location of one of the largest annual motorcycle events in the world: the Sturgis Motorcycle Rally, which lasts for 10 days beginning on the first Friday of August. It attracts large numbers of motorcycle enthusiasts from around the world. Sturgis is also noted for hosting WCW's Hog Wild/Road Wild events from 1996 to 1999.

History
Sturgis was founded in 1878. An early nickname for the town was "Scooptown." Scooptown had been an earlier settlement at the base of Bear Butte, that supplied the soldiers at Camp Sturgis an outlet for their vices. When it became apparent that Sturgis was going to be the city that supplied the newly formed Fort Meade, the occupants of Scooptown moved en masse to Sturgis and set up their shops. Sturgis was named in honor of the Civil War Union General Samuel D. Sturgis. In 1889, Sturgis was designated as the county seat of the newly formed Meade County.

As part of the vast Ellsworth Air Force Base complex, the land north of Sturgis was dotted with 50 Minuteman missile silos.

Towards the end of the summer of 2015, the Full Throttle Saloon, one of the largest and best-known bars in Sturgis, burned down.

Geography

Climate
Sturgis has a hot-summer humid continental climate (Dfa.) The hardiness zone is 5a.

Demographics

2010 census
As of the census of 2010, there were 6,627 people, 2,916 households, and 1,687 families living in the city. The racial makeup of the city was 93.9% White, 0.2% African American, 2.3% Native American, 0.4% Asian, 0.6% from other races, and 2.6% from two or more races. Hispanic or Latino of any race were 2.6% of the population.

There were 2,916 households, of which 28.8% had children under the age of 18 living with them, 41.3% were married couples living together, 12.2% had a female householder with no husband present, 4.4% had a male householder with no wife present, and 42.1% were non-families. 37.0% of all households were made up of individuals, and 17.2% had someone living alone who was 65 years of age or older. The average household size was 2.21 and the average family size was 2.89.

The median age in the city was 41.2 years. 23.9% of residents were under the age of 18; 7.8% were between the ages of 18 and 24; 22.3% were from 25 to 44; 27.1% were from 45 to 64; and 18.8% were 65 years of age or older. The gender makeup of the city was 48.1% male and 51.9% female.

2000 census
As of the census of 2000, there were 6,442 people, 2,738 households, and 1,708 families living in the city. The population density was 1,723.6 people per square mile (665.0/km2). There were 2,989 housing units at an average density of 799.7 per square mile (308.6/km2). The racial makeup of the city was 94.80% White, 0.20% African American, 2.48% Native American, 0.31% Asian, 0.33% from other races, and 1.88% from two or more races. Hispanic or Latino of any race were 1.75% of the population.

There were 2,738 households, out of which 30.2% had children under the age of 18 living with them, 48.0% were married couples living together, 11.5% had a female householder with no husband present, and 37.6% were non-families. 33.3% of all households were made up of individuals, and 15.6% had someone living alone who was 65 years of age or older. The average household size was 2.29 and the average family size was 2.91.

In the city, the population was spread out, with 25.0% under the age of 18, 7.9% from 18 to 24, 25.4% from 25 to 44, 22.5% from 45 to 64, and 19.3% who were 65 years of age or older. The median age was 40 years. For every 100 females, there were 91.0 males. For every 100 females age 18 and over, there were 86.1 males.

As of 2000 the median income for a household in the city was $30,253, and the median income for a family was $38,698. Males had a median income of $25,856 versus $18,582 for females. The per capita income for the city was $16,763. About 11.0% of families and 12.0% of the population were below the poverty line, including 12.7% of those under age 18 and 6.8% of those age 65 or over.

Arts and culture

Fort Meade Recreation Area
 Sturgis Motorcycle Museum & Hall of Fame
 South Dakota Centennial Trail
 Loud American Roadhouse
 Poker Alice House, formerly the bordello of the frontier gambler Alice Ivers Tubbs, known as Poker Alice

Public sculptures 
Kinship at the Sturgis Community Center
General Samuel D. Sturgis at the Hills and Plains Park at the east entrance to town
Jesus in the Garden at the First United Methodist Church Memorial Garden
St. Francis of Assisi at the St. Francis of Assisi Catholic Church
STURGIS spelled out in letters

Media

Radio stations
 KBHB 810 (AM)
 KRCS 93.1 (FM)

Notable people
Raymond W. Carpenter, United States Army Major General and acting Director of the Army National Guard (Born in Sturgis, graduated from Sturgis Brown High School)
Francis H. Case, former resident, journalist and politician
Scott DesJarlais, former resident, physician and politician
J.C. "Pappy" Hoel, Credited with starting the Sturgis Motorcycle Rally
Carroll Hardy, born in Sturgis, former Major League Baseball player
Alice Ivers Duffield Tubbs Huckert, better known as Poker Alice, frontier gambler, lived her later years in Sturgis but died in Rapid City
Marty Jackley, Attorney General of South Dakota, born in Sturgis
Herbert A. Littleton, former resident, posthumous recipient of the Medal of Honor
Megan Mahoney, former resident, basketball player
Paige McPherson, Olympic bronze medalist in taekwondo
Larry Rhoden, born in Sturgis, South Dakota Lieutenant Governor 
Rex Terry, born in Sturgis, banker and South Dakota politician
Robert Willard "Bobby" Buntrock, child actor in classic sitcoms

References

External links

 City of Sturgis
 Sturgis Chamber of Commerce
 

 
1878 establishments in Dakota Territory
Black Hills
Cities in Meade County, South Dakota
Cities in South Dakota
County seats in South Dakota
Rapid City, South Dakota metropolitan area